The 2003 United States state legislative elections were held on November 7, 2003, alongside other elections. Elections were held for 8 legislative chambers. Both chambers of the Northern Mariana Islands legislature was up. 

Partisan change only occurred in one chamber, as Democrats won control of the New Jersey Senate, which was previously tied. However, Democrats did maintain control of the Mississippi Legislature, the Louisiana Legislature, and the New Jersey General Assembly. Republicans maintained control of the Virginia legislature, bringing a post-Civil War low for the Democratic Party.

Summary table 
Regularly-scheduled elections were held in 8 of the 99 state legislative chambers in the United States. Nationwide, regularly-scheduled elections were held for 578 of the 7,383 legislative seats. This table only covers regularly-scheduled elections; additional special elections took place concurrently with these regularly-scheduled elections.

Results

State-by-state

Upper houses

Lower houses

Results

Territories

Upper houses

Lower houses

Notes

References

 
 
State legislative elections
State legislature elections in the United States by year